Preston Pablo is a 21-year-old Canadian singer-songwriter from Timmins, Ontario. He is most noted as a three-time Juno Award nominee at the Juno Awards of 2023, winning the Breakthrough Artist of the Year award, and receving nods for Single of the Year for "Flowers Need Rain", and the Fan Choice Award.

Career 
He learned to play drums at age 13 and then learned to play the guitar.

He made his solo musical debut in high school with the single "OMO". Montreal-based producers Banx & Ranx discovered Preston through social media and was later on signed with 31 East under Universal Music Canada. In January 2022, he released his first single, "Don't Break (My Soul)" under Universal Music Canada.

In September 2022, he released the single "Flowers Need Rain". The platinum-selling single reached a Top 5 spot at Top 40 radio in Canada and Top 10 at Hot AC and Mainstream AC. He then released “Love You Bad” in October 2022.

In 2023, he participated in an all-star recording of Serena Ryder's single "What I Wouldn't Do", which was released as a charity single to benefit Kids Help Phone's Feel Out Loud campaign for youth mental health.

References 

21st-century Canadian male singers
Canadian pop singers
Living people
Musicians from Timmins
Year of birth missing (living people)
Juno Award for Breakthrough Artist of the Year winners